David Robert Jones,  (28 January 1941 – 19 November 2010) was a British born zoologist and biologist.

He was educated at Bristol Cathedral School, the University of Southampton (BSc) and the University of East Anglia (PhD, 1965) He then worked at the University of Bristol, and joined the Zoology Department of the University of British Columbia in 1969 where he spent the remainder of his career ultimately becoming Killam Research Scholar and Professor Emeritus. During his career he was awarded the Fry Medal of the Canadian Society of Zoologists, the Killam Research Prize, the Flavelle Medal of the Royal Society of Canada, Fellowship of the Royal Society of Canada, and the Order of Canada.

References

1941 births
2010 deaths
People educated at Bristol Cathedral Choir School
Alumni of the University of Southampton
Alumni of the University of East Anglia
Academics of the University of Bristol
Academic staff of the University of British Columbia
Fellows of the Royal Society of Canada
Members of the Order of Canada